David Roos (born 29 May 1982 in Queenstown) is a Paralympian athlete from South Africa competing mainly in category F46 sprints, long and high jump events.

Roos has competed in three Paralympic Games.  In the 2000 Summer Paralympics he competed in the T46 100 metres and F46 long jump as well as winning a bronze medal in the F46 high jump.  Four years later in Athens in 2004  he went home without a medal after competing in the T46 200m, F46 long jump and F44/46 high jump.  He had better luck in the 2008 Summer Paralympics winning a silver in the F46 long jump and competed in the T46 100 and 200 metres and the F44/46 high jump. In 2011 he won a gold medal at the IPC World Championships as part of the South African team for the Men's 4 x 100 metres relay.

References

External links
 

Paralympic athletes of South Africa
Athletes (track and field) at the 2000 Summer Paralympics
Athletes (track and field) at the 2004 Summer Paralympics
Athletes (track and field) at the 2008 Summer Paralympics
Paralympic silver medalists for South Africa
Paralympic bronze medalists for South Africa
Living people
1982 births
Medalists at the 2000 Summer Paralympics
Medalists at the 2008 Summer Paralympics
Commonwealth Games medallists in athletics
Commonwealth Games silver medallists for South Africa
Athletes (track and field) at the 2006 Commonwealth Games
Paralympic medalists in athletics (track and field)
South African male sprinters
South African male high jumpers
South African male long jumpers
People from Queenstown, South Africa
Sportspeople from the Eastern Cape
20th-century South African people
21st-century South African people
Sprinters with limb difference
High jumpers with limb difference
Long jumpers with limb difference
Paralympic sprinters
Paralympic high jumpers
Paralympic long jumpers
Medallists at the 2006 Commonwealth Games